Morlacchi is a family name of Italian origin. 
It might indicate an ultimate family origin connected with the Morlachs, a Balkan ethnic group which had considerable interaction with Italians (particularly those from the Republic of Venice). 

It may refer to: 

 Federico Morlacchi, Italian paralympic swimmer
 Carlo Gritti Morlacchi, Italian Bishop
 Francesco Morlacchi, Italian opera composer
 Giuseppina Morlacchi, Italian dancer
 Lucilla Morlacchi, Italian actress

Morlacchi may also refer to:
 The Italian name for the aforementioned Morlachs
 The Teatro Morlacchi at Perugia, Italy

See also
 Morlachs (disambiguation)

Italian-language surnames